Probuzhdeniye is a rural locality (a village) in Borisoglebskoye Rural Settlement, Muromsky District, Vladimir Oblast, Russia. The population was 18 as of 2010.

Geography 
Probuzhdeniye is located 30 km north of Murom (the district's administrative centre) by road. Ozhigovo is the nearest rural locality.

References 

Rural localities in Muromsky District